Dosima is a genus of goose barnacles in the family Lepadidae. There are at least two described species in Dosima.

Species
These species belong to the genus Dosima:
 Dosima fascicularis (Ellis & Solander, 1786) (buoy barnacle)
 Dosima guanamuthui (Daniel, 1971)

References

Barnacles